Black Out! is a homebrew puzzle video game developed and published by Stormworks Interactive exclusively for the Atari Jaguar on July 9, 2012 and later for the Atari Jaguar CD during the same year. Black Out! is a puzzle game that borrows rules from Tiger Electronics' Lights Out and Parker Brothers' Magic Square from the Merlin handheld electronic game, where players must turn off all of the light bulbs present in a 3 by 3 grid with the lowest amount of moves possible as the main objective.  It is the first and only title to be released for the platform as of date by its developer.

Gameplay 

Each round presents a set light pattern that must be turned off in order to advance into the next round, of which there are 10 across four stages for a total of 40 patterns to be solved, with each one increasing in complexity. Depending on the level of difficulty selected at the options menu, players have a pre-set move limit and a fixed time limit as well to solve the puzzle efficiently. If the players have cleared several rounds in a row without failing to solve the puzzle and at a quick pace, an item will be granted and they can be used to solve puzzles. Failing to solve any puzzle will send players back to the beginning round of the current stage after using a limited number of continues and the game is over after running out of continues. If the players press the pause button during a puzzle, they will be mocked by the game for attempting to do so. Finishing the game on the highest difficulty will grant access to an extra stage at the main menu, featuring a new set of puzzles to be solved.

Development and release 
Black Out! was conceived and developed by a small team at Stormworks Interactive, an American company founded a few years after Hasbro Interactive released the patents and rights to the Atari Jaguar into public domain in 1999 by declaring it as an open platform and opening the doors for homebrew development as a result, becoming one of the few independent developers committed to the Jaguar at the time. It was solely coded by programmer Jeff Nihlean, while the hand-drawn graphics and sound effects were created by artist Shawn Lavery. The soundtrack was composed by Chris "-cTrix" Mylrae and the cover art was drawn by Emily Sheldon. Development of the project began in 2009 and the process lasted 3 years.

Prior to its eventual release to the public, the group had previously developed various projects for the system such as an adventure game titled Arkanna, which were never completed and served as learning exercises in order to program for the platform. The cartridge version of Black Out! was officially released on July 9, 2012 as a limited run and came in a packaging mimicking an officially licensed Jaguar release but the initial batch of copies do not work correctly on PAL systems. The CD version was also published during the same year, featuring minimal changes compared to the original cartridge release. The title received coverage from gaming news websites and magazines such as VentureBeat and Retro Gamer for being on a console deemed as a commercial failure.

Legacy 
Black Out! remains the only completed and shipped title by Stormworks Interactive as of date and was part from one of the many projects in development by the group for the Jaguar platform and possibly for other systems, as the company had more titles planned to be released such as conversions of Digital Café's Chex Quest, Raven Software's Heretic and the Freedoom project, among others.

References

External links 
 

2012 video games
Atari Jaguar games
Atari Jaguar CD games
Atari Jaguar-only games
Homebrew software
Puzzle video games
Single-player video games
Video games developed in the United States